Tagetes triradiata is a Mexican species of marigold in the family Asteraceae. It is native to central Mexico (Puebla, Morelos, México State, D.F., Veracruz).

Tagetes triradiata is an hairless annual herb up to 50 cm (20 inches) tall. Leaves are pinnately compound with 15-21 leaflets. One plant produces numerous small flower heads in a flat-topped array, each containing 3 bright yellow ray florets surrounding several yellow disc florets.

References

External links
Arizona State Vascular Plant Herbarium

triradiata
Endemic flora of Mexico
Flora of Central Mexico
Plants described in 1897